Berwick Castle is a ruined castle in Berwick-upon-Tweed, Northumberland, England.

History

The castle was commissioned by the Scottish King David I in the 1120s. It was taken by the English forces under the terms of the Treaty of Falaise in 1175 but then sold back to Scotland by the English King Richard I to fund the Third Crusade in around 1190.

In November 1292, representatives of the English King Edward I arrived in Berwick and announced, in the great hall of the castle, King Edward's adjudication in favour of John Balliol of the dispute between him, Robert the Bruce and the count of Holland for the Crown of Scotland. The castle was retaken by the forces of King Edward I in March 1296 during the First War of Scottish Independence. However, the forces of Robert the Bruce recovered the castle for Scotland in April 1318.

In 1330, "Roberto de Lawedre" of the Bass, described as Custodian or Keeper of the Marches and the Castle of Berwick, received, apparently upon the termination of his employment there, £33.6s.8d, plus a similar amount, from the Scottish Exchequer.

Robert Ogle was captain of the castle in 1435. The castle was worth circa £194 in peacetime, with another £200 to be paid in time of war.

In 1464, the Exchequer Rolls of Scotland record that Robert Lauder of Edrington was paid £20 for repairs made to Berwick Castle. The castle finally fell into English hands in the last week of August 1482, when Richard, Duke of Gloucester captured the castle from Patrick Hepburn, 1st Lord Hailes, during his invasion of Scotland. Planned repairs to the castle in 1483 were entrusted to Alexander Lee, a royal chaplain. The master carpenter of Berwick, George Porter, was ordered to build 120 houses in the town, and chambers, a hall, and a lodging in the castle.<ref>Rosemary Horrox, Financial Memoranda of the Reign of Edward V, Camden Miscellany, XXIX (London, 1987), pp. 218, 225.</ref>

The castle was rendered obsolete by the construction of modern ramparts around Berwick during the reign of Elizabeth I in the late 16th century and it went into steady decline. In August 1590 John Selby reported that a round tower used as the castle's only gun emplacement had collapsed in wet weather. Large parts of the structure were simply used as a quarry (notably for the construction of the parish church, Holy Trinity, during the Commonwealth).

In 1847 the Great Hall of Berwick Castle was demolished to make way for Berwick-upon-Tweed railway station on the North British Railway.

Governors, or keepers, of the castle

 Sir William Douglas, 1294–1296 surrendered to Edward I of England following the Massacre of Berwick
 Maurice de Berkeley, 2nd Baron Berkeley, English governor c.1314
 Edmond de Caillou, Gascon governor for the English, killed at the Battle of Skaithmuir 1316.
 Sir Robert de Lawedre of the Bass, 1330-3.Berwick-upon-Tweed, the History of the Town and Guild, by John Scott, London, 1888, pps.248-9.
 Patrick de Dunbar, 5th Earl of March, January–July 1333.
 Sir Andrew Murray, 1337.
 Sir Richard Tempest 1385-1386
 Robert Ogle captain of the castle, 1435.
 Robert de Lawedre of Edrington (later, "of the Bass"), 1461/2–1474.
 David, Earl of Crawford, 1474–1478.
 Sir Robert Lauder of The Bass, Knt., 1478–1482.Burnett, 1886, vol.ix, pps: 63/4. 81, 145 & 157.
 Sir Patrick Hepburn, 1st Lord Hailes, 1482 (last Scottish governor).
 Sir William Drury (d.1579), Marshal of Berwick-upon-Tweed, before 1564.
 Francis Russell, 2nd Earl of Bedford, appointed 1564
 Sir George Bowes of Streatlam, County Durham (d. 1580), Marshal of Berwick, who, in 1568, escorted Mary, Queen of Scots, from Carlisle to Bolton Castle; Bowes' sister (Margery) married John Knox.

Popular Culture
The castle features in The Scottish Chiefs.

Notes

References
   Images of Berwick upon Tweed Castle
 The David & Charles Book of Castles, by Plantagenet Somerset Fry, David & Charles, 1980. 
 The History of Scotland, by John Hill Burton, Edinburgh, 1874: vols: iv. p. 364–5, v. pps: 68, 71, 73, 115, 120, 257, and 365, for Sir William Drury
 John Knox'', by Lord Eustace Percy, London, 1937, p. 165.

External links
 
 
 
 

Castles in Northumberland
Ruins in Northumberland
English Heritage sites in Northumberland
History of Northumberland
Tourist attractions in Northumberland
Wars of Scottish Independence
History of the Scottish Borders
Castles in the Scottish Borders
12th-century establishments in England
Berwick-upon-Tweed
Scottish parliamentary locations and buildings
Ruined castles in England